Space Delta 9 (DEL 9) is a United States Space Force unit responsible for conducting orbital warfare. Its mission involves preparing, presenting, and projecting assigned and attached forces for the purpose of conducting protect and defend operations and providing national decision authorities with response options to deter and, when necessary, defeat orbital threats. Activated on 24 July 2020, the delta is headquartered at Schriever Space Force Base, Colorado.

It replaced the interim 750th Operations Group, 50th Space Wing, which was activated a month before its redesignation.

Structure

List of commanders

References 

Deltas of the United States Space Force